The 63rd Guards Rifle Division was a Soviet division during World War II. Among other operations, it fought in the Battle of Tali-Ihantala from June 25 to July 9, 1944, during the Continuation War.

In July 1946, it became 37th Guards Mechanised Division, and in 1957 the 37th Guards Motor Rifle Division. It was located at Sertalovo in the Leningrad Military District.

On 6 February 1965 it regained its Second World War number and became the 63rd Guards Training Motor Rifle Division. (In late 1964 the previous 63 MRD in Lugansk, Kiev MD, had been redesignated the 4th Guards Motor Rifle Division.)

In the 1980s it was the 63rd Guards Motor Rifle Training Division.

In 1987 it became the 56th Guards District Training Centre.

References

 

G056
Military units and formations established in 1987
Continuation War